Carl Wilhelm Correns (19 May 1893 – 29 August 1980) was a German geologist who pioneered the field of sedimentary petrology. He was noted as an influential teacher and for his textbook Einführung in die Mineralogie (1949). Correns received the Roebling Medal of  the Geological Society of America in 1976.

Correns was born in Tübingen to botanists Carl Erich Correns and Elisabeth Widmer. He went to the universities of Tübingen and Münster with an interruption during World War I. After serving as a reserve officer, he returned to complete his PhD at the University of Berlin in 1920. His thesis supervised by J.F. Pompecki was on petrography and paleontology of Devonian limestone. He was inspired by the book Lehrbuch der Mineralogie by Paul Niggli that he came across in Christmas of 1920 and attended seminars by Arrien Johnsen at Berlin.  He joined the Prussian Geological Survey from 1922 to 1926 after serving as an assistant to Erich Kaiser at the University of Munich. He then worked on colloidal chemistry under Herbert Freundlich at the Kaiser Wilhelm Institut and joined as Privatdozent at the University of Berlin. In 1926 he joined the Meteor Expedition into the South Atlantic on the recommendation of Fritz Haber. He then joined Rostock University at the newly created department of geology and made use of X-ray diffraction to study minerals. He took a special interest in clay minerals, studying Mecklenburg soils and the ocean-bed core samples from the Meteor Expedition. He became a full professor in 1929. He was made head of the Institute for Sedimentary Petrology in 1939 and worked at Göttingen until his death. He was noted for his teaching, mentoring nearly 61 doctoral students and his textbook Einführung in die Mineralogie (1949) was considered a landmark in geology. He also published Die Entstehung der Gesteine (1939) in which he examined the formation of sedimentary rocks.

References 

1893 births
1980 deaths
20th-century German geologists
Scientists from Tübingen
Members of the Royal Swedish Academy of Sciences